The 2021 Tennessee Lottery 250 was a NASCAR Xfinity Series race held on June 19, 2021. It was contested over 189 laps -- extended from 188 laps due to an overtime finish -- on the  superspeedway. It was the fifteenth race of the 2021 NASCAR Xfinity Series season. Joe Gibbs Racing driver Kyle Busch, collected his third win of the season. Busch also became the first driver in NASCAR Xfinity series history to win 100 races.

Report

Background
Nashville Superspeedway is a motor racing complex located in Gladeville, Tennessee (though the track has a Lebanon address), United States, about 30 miles (48 km) southeast of Nashville. The track was built in 2001 and is currently used for events, driving schools and GT Academy, a reality television competition. It is a concrete oval track 1 miles (2.145 km) long. Nashville Superspeedway is owned by Dover Motorsports, Inc., which also owns Dover International Speedway. Nashville Superspeedway was the longest concrete oval in NASCAR during the time it was on the Xfinity series and NASCAR Camping World Truck Series circuits. Current permanent seating capacity is approximately 25,000. Additional portable seats are brought in for some events, and seating capacity can be expanded to 150,000. Infrastructure is in place to expand the facility to include a short track, drag strip, and road course.

Entry list 

 (R) denotes rookie driver.
 (i) denotes driver who is ineligible for series driver points.

Practice 

Qualifying

Qualifying results

Race

Race results

Stage Results 
Stage One
Laps: 45

Stage Two
Laps: 45

Final Stage Results 

Laps: 98

Race statistics 

 Lead changes: 12 among 5 different drivers
 Cautions/Laps: 8 for 46
 Time of race: 2 hours, 20 minutes, and 48 seconds
 Average speed:

References 

NASCAR races at Nashville Superspeedway
2021 in sports in Tennessee
Tennessee Lottery 250
2021 NASCAR Xfinity Series